The Washington Bridge, also known as the Devon Bridge, carries U.S. Route 1 (US 1) over the Housatonic River in the U.S. state of Connecticut, connecting the city of Milford to the town of Stratford.  Its geographic location is N 41.20037 by W −73.11039. It is considered architecturally notable by the National Register of Historic Places for its five  arches.  It is designated Bridge No. 327 by the state Department of Transportation.

The Washington Bridge is the longest drawbridge on the Boston Post Road. The bridge, which cost $1.5 million in 1921, was the largest and most expensive project of the state highway department up to the date of its construction.

History

Prior to the current bridge there were two previous spans, serving from 1803 to 1894, and from 1894 to 1921 (see postcard image).

The first noted transport across the river at this point was a ferry that began service around May 1758. The Sons of the American Revolution note that this crossing was likely used by George Washington on his journey from Philadelphia to Cambridge, Massachusetts to assume his command of the Colonial Army in 1775.

The first bridge at this point was proposed in 1803 by the Milford and Stratford Bridge Company, which changed its name to the Washington Bridge Company that same year. The first permanent standing (wooden) bridge opened in 1813, complete with a toll. This bridge was rebuilt at least twice: once in 1807 when ice flows carried the bridge out to sea and again in 1868 when it was struck by the steamer Monitor.

In 1844 Governor Roger Sherman Baldwin vetoed a bill requiring the Washington Bridge Company to make alterations to the bridge at its own expense even though the conditions requiring these changes did not exist when the bridge was originally built. The veto was overridden by an act of the Connecticut General Assembly.

In 1845 the Supreme Court of the United States ruled that the act was unconstitutional in Washington Bridge Company v. Stewart.

The second bridge opened in 1894 and was built of iron for $88,500. It featured two  fixed spans and a single  swinging span in the center, with a walking path on the northern side. A trolley line was originally objected to by the New York, New Haven & Hartford Railroad but was ultimately added in the southern lane.

Built in 1921, the original fabricator of the current bridge was Bethlehem Steel.
 It was designed by John Alexander Low Waddell, a noted structural engineer with over 1000 structures to his credit. Originally the bridge supported two streetcar tracks and two lanes for passenger cars.
 At the time of its construction, it was the most expensive project yet undertaken by the Connecticut Department of Transportation, costing $1.5 million.

The Washington Bridge was listed on the National Register of Historic Places in 2004.

Non-motorized access
The Washington Bridge is the only crossing of the Housatonic River for pedestrians or bicyclists near Long Island Sound. The next available crossing would be the newly reconstructed Igor I. Sikorsky Memorial Bridge roughly  upriver.

It is illegal to fish from the bridge.

Renovations
The bridge has seen several renovations, including those completed in:
 1935: Removal of streetcar apparatus to increase passenger car traffic from two lanes to four.
 1989: Repaving and superstructure (including concrete parapet and railing).
 2007: $18.5 million overhaul which included fibreglass fenders for the bridge piers, installation of its own generator, a new bridge control system, and a complete overhaul to the mechanical apparatus.

Safety inspection results
Inspection ratings from the National Bridge Inventory as of September 2010 were:
Deck condition rating: Fair (5 out of 9)
Superstructure condition rating: Fair (5 out of 9)
Substructure condition rating: Fair (5 out of 9)
Sufficiency rating: 55.4 (out of 100)

See also
 List of crossings of the Housatonic River
 Moses Wheeler Bridge: Crosses the Housatonic River on nearby Interstate 95
 Igor I. Sikorsky Memorial Bridge: Crosses the Housatonic River on nearby Route 15
 National Register of Historic Places listings in Fairfield County, Connecticut
 National Register of Historic Places listings in New Haven County, Connecticut
 List of bridges on the National Register of Historic Places in Connecticut

References

Buildings and structures in Milford, Connecticut
Buildings and structures in Stratford, Connecticut
Bridges completed in 1921
Road bridges on the National Register of Historic Places in Connecticut
Bridges in Fairfield County, Connecticut
Bridges in New Haven County, Connecticut
U.S. Route 1
Bridges of the United States Numbered Highway System
Drawbridges on the National Register of Historic Places
National Register of Historic Places in Fairfield County, Connecticut
National Register of Historic Places in New Haven County, Connecticut
Former toll bridges in Connecticut
Bridges over the Housatonic River
Steel bridges in the United States
Open-spandrel deck arch bridges in the United States
Bascule bridges in the United States